Thomas Paul Fleetwood (born 19 January 1991) is an English professional golfer who plays on the PGA Tour and European Tour. He has won six times on the European Tour.

Background and amateur career
Fleetwood was born on 19 January 1991 in Southport, Merseyside, England. He had a distinguished amateur career which included wins in the 2009 Scottish Amateur Stroke Play Championship and the 2010 English Amateur, and runner-up finishes in the 2008 Amateur Championship, the 2010 New South Wales Amateur and the 2010 Spanish Amateur and the 2010 European Amateur. Fleetwood represented Great Britain and Ireland in the Walker Cup in 2009. He also reached number 3 in The R&A's World Amateur Golf Ranking, and number 1 on the Scratch Players World Amateur Rankings.

In July 2010, Fleetwood finished as runner-up to Daniel Gaunt in the English Challenge on Europe's second tier Challenge Tour. Fleetwood won the English Amateur at the beginning of August and turned professional shortly afterwards.

Professional career
Fleetwood made his professional début at the 2010 Czech Open on the European Tour, where he made the cut and finished tied for 67th. In September 2011 he claimed his first Challenge Tour win at the Kazakhstan Open, which secured his place on the European Tour for 2012.

In August 2013, Fleetwood won his maiden title on the European Tour at the Johnnie Walker Championship at Gleneagles. He won in a three-man sudden death playoff, after a birdie on the first extra hole to see off Stephen Gallacher and Ricardo González.

On 22 May 2015, Fleetwood scored an albatross on the par-5 4th hole at the Wentworth Club during the second round of the BMW PGA Championship.

In January 2017, Fleetwood won his second European Tour event, the Abu Dhabi HSBC Golf Championship, by one stroke over Dustin Johnson and Pablo Larrazábal after a final round 67. In March, Fleetwood was runner-up in the WGC-Mexico Championship, a shot behind Johnson. In April, he lost in a sudden-death playoff at the Shenzhen International to Bernd Wiesberger, at the first extra hole. Fleetwood had come from eight strokes behind on the final day with a stunning round of 63 to set the clubhouse lead. In the playoff, Fleetwood found the green in two, but Wiesberger from trouble fired an approach to within five feet and holed the birdie putt for the victory. In June, Fleetwood finished fourth in the U.S. Open, while in July, he won the Open de France, beating Peter Uihlein by a stroke, after a bogey-free final round 66. He moved from 99th in the World Rankings at the start of the year into the world top-20. In November 2017, Fleetwood won the European Tour season-long Race to Dubai and won $1,250,000 from the bonus pool.

Fleetwood won the Abu Dhabi HSBC Championship by two strokes from Ross Fisher to begin the 2018 season. He had a final round of 65, with six birdies in the last nine holes.

Fleetwood is the sixth golfer to shoot a 63 in U.S. Open history, tying the championship's single round scoring record. He did this in the fourth round of the 2018 U.S. Open on 17 June at the Shinnecock Hills Golf Club in Southampton, New York. He finished one stroke behind the winner Brooks Koepka.

In the 2018 Ryder Cup, Fleetwood paired with Francesco Molinari. They became the first pairing to win all four of their matches, as Europe won 17.5–10.5 

In July 2019, Fleetwood finished second in the 2019 Open Championship at Royal Portrush Golf Club in Northern Ireland.

In November 2019, Fleetwood made three eagles in the final round to win the Nedbank Golf Challenge in South Africa. Fleetwood won in a playoff over Marcus Kinhult. This event was part of the European Tour's Rolex Series and was co-sanctioned by the Sunshine Tour. 

In October 2020, Fleetwood birdied the 72nd hole to join Aaron Rai in a playoff at the Aberdeen Standard Investments Scottish Open. However he was defeated when he missed a par putt from short-range on the first extra hole.

In September 2021, Fleetwood played on the European team in the 2021 Ryder Cup at Whistling Straits in Kohler, Wisconsin. The U.S. team won 19–9 and Fleetwood went 0–1–2 including a tie in his Sunday singles match against Jordan Spieth.

In November 2022, Fleetwood won the Nedbank Golf Challenge at Gary Player Country Club in South Africa. He successfully defended this title, having been last played in 2019. It was also his first victory since then as well.

Amateur wins
2009 Scottish Open Amateur Stroke Play Championship
2010 English Amateur

Professional wins (9)

European Tour wins (6)

1Co-sanctioned by the Sunshine Tour
2Co-sanctioned by the Sunshine Tour, but unofficial money event.

European Tour playoff record (2–2)

Challenge Tour wins (1)

PGA EuroPro Tour wins (1)

Other wins (1)

Results in major championships
Results not in chronological order in 2020.

CUT = missed the half-way cut
"T" indicates a tie for a place
NT = No tournament due to COVID-19 pandemic

Summary

Most consecutive cuts made – 12 (2017 U.S. Open – 2020 PGA)
Longest streak of top-10s – 1 (five times, current)

Results in The Players Championship

CUT = missed the halfway cut
"T" indicates a tie for a place
C = Cancelled after the first round due to the COVID-19 pandemic

Results in World Golf Championships
Results not in chronological order before 2015.
 
1Cancelled due to COVID-19 pandemic

QF, R16, R32, R64 = Round in which player lost in match play
NT = No Tournament
"T" = tied
Note that the Championship and Invitational were discontinued from 2022.

Team appearances
Amateur
European Boys' Team Championship (representing England): 2007, 2008
Jacques Léglise Trophy (representing Great Britain & Ireland): 2007 (winners), 2008 (winners)
European Amateur Team Championship (representing England): 2009, 2010 (winners)
Walker Cup (representing Great Britain & Ireland): 2009
Bonallack Trophy (representing Europe): 2010 (cancelled)

Professional
Seve Trophy (representing Great Britain & Ireland): 2013
EurAsia Cup (representing Europe): 2018 (winners)
Ryder Cup (representing Europe): 2018 (winners), 2021
Hero Cup (representing Great Britain & Ireland): 2023

See also
2011 Challenge Tour graduates

References

External links

English male golfers
European Tour golfers
Ryder Cup competitors for Europe
Olympic golfers of Great Britain
Golfers at the 2020 Summer Olympics
Sportspeople from Southport
1991 births
Living people